Megacyllene decora, the Amorpha borer, is a species of beetle in the family Cerambycidae occurring in the central United States. Its larvae feed only on the false indigo plant, Amorpha fruticosa, and its range largely overlaps that of the host plant. It was described by Olivier in 1795.

References

Megacyllene
Beetles described in 1795